3-Hydroxy picolinic acid is a picolinic acid derivative and is a member of the pyridine family.  It is used as a matrix for nucleotides in MALDI mass spectrometry analyses.

See also 
Matrix-assisted laser desorption/ionization
Sinapinic acid
Picolinic acid
α-Cyano-4-hydroxycinnamic acid

References

Hydroxypyridines
Alpha hydroxy acids